Waqrapukara or Waqra Pukara (possibly from Quechua waqra horn, pukara fortress, "horn fortress") is an archaeological site in Peru located in the Cusco Region, Acomayo Province, Pomacanchi District. It lies near the Apurímac River.

References 

Archaeological sites in Peru
Archaeological sites in Cusco Region